Sylvester Carlisle (May 16, 1926 – December 5, 1970) was an American Negro league second baseman in the 1940s.

A native of Houston, Texas, Carlisle played for the Kansas City Monarchs in 1945. He died in 1970 at age 44.

References

External links
 and Seamheads

1926 births
1970 deaths
Place of death missing
Kansas City Monarchs players
20th-century African-American sportspeople